Laurence Benjamin Bleach (July 16, 1912 – March 15, 1991) was an American Negro league second baseman in 1937.

Early life and career
A native of Brunswick, Georgia, Bleach attended the University of Detroit, where he excelled in basketball, becoming the Titans' first African American captain; he later played for the Harlem Globetrotters. Titans head coach Lloyd Brazil called Bleach "the best all-around basketball player I've ever coached". Bleach also played baseball very briefly in 1937 for the Detroit Stars of the Negro American League. Bleach died in Detroit, Michigan in 1991 at age 78.

References

Further reading
 Standard Union staff (April 10, 1931). "Textile, 9; New Utrecht, 1". The Brooklyn Standard Union. p. 11
 Daily Eagle staff (June 14, 1931). "Textile High Defeats Madison, 10-2, to Win P.S.A.L. Crown; Bleach's Double Scores Pair". The Brooklyn Daily Eagle. p. 35
 Age staff (November 14, 1931). "Y Seniors Defeated by Bronx Manor Five". The New York Age. p. 6
 Kremenko, Bernard (January 10, 1932). "Textile High Quint Halts Jefferson's Victory March". p. 91
 Cowan, Russ (December 23, 1933). "Thru the Sport Mirror". Detroit Tribune.
 Free Press staff (January 31, 1936) "Titans Count On This Trio in First Real Test of Basketball Campaign". Detroit Free Press. p. 19
 Saunders, Lonny (July 4, 1936). "Alpha Team Defeats Naricema". The Detroit Tribune. p. 6 
 Free Press staff (December 12, 1937). "Ex-Titan Star in a New Role as a Detective". Detroit Free Press. p. 56
 Johnson, Ben (November 30, 1980). "They Were Stars with Nowhere to Go". Detroit Free Press. pp. 1H, 9H

External links
 and Seamheads

1912 births
1991 deaths
Detroit Mercy Titans men's basketball players
Harlem Globetrotters players
Detroit Stars (1937) players
20th-century African-American sportspeople
Baseball infielders